was a Japanese samurai warrior of the Sengoku period.  He was a retainer of the Takeda clan of Kai Province.  He is known as one of the "Twenty-Four Generals of Takeda Shingen".

References

Samurai
1540 births
1595 deaths